The Union Jack, or Union Flag, is the de facto national flag of the United Kingdom. Although no law has been passed  making the Union Flag the official national flag of the United Kingdom, it has effectively become such through precedent. It is sometimes asserted that the term Union Jack properly refers only to naval usage, but this assertion was dismissed by the Flag Institute in 2013 following historical investigations. The flag has official status in Canada, by parliamentary resolution, where it is known as the Royal Union Flag. It is the national flag of all British overseas territories, being localities within the British state, or realm, although local flags have also been authorised for most, usually comprising the blue or red ensign with the Union Flag in the canton and defaced with the distinguishing arms of the territory. These may be flown in place of, or along with (but taking precedence after) the national flag. Governors of British Overseas Territories have their own personal flags, which are the Union Flag with the distinguishing arms of the colony at the centre. The Union Flag also appears in the canton (upper flagpole-side quarter) of the flags of several nations and territories that are former British possessions or dominions, as well as in the flag of the US State of Hawaii, which has no such connection.

The origins of the earlier flag of Great Britain date back to 1606. King James VI of Scotland had inherited the English and Irish thrones in 1603 as James I, thereby uniting the crowns of England, Scotland, and Ireland in a personal union, although the three kingdoms remained separate states. On 12 April 1606, a new flag to represent this regal union between England and Scotland was specified in a royal decree, according to which the flag of England, a red cross on a white background, known as St George's Cross, and the flag of Scotland, a white saltire (X-shaped cross, or St Andrew's Cross) on a blue background, would be joined, forming the flag of England and Scotland for maritime purposes.

The present design of the Union Flag dates from a Royal proclamation following the union of Great Britain and Ireland in 1801. The flag combines aspects of three older national flags: the red cross of St George for the Kingdom of England, the white saltire of St Andrew for Scotland and the red saltire of St Patrick to represent Ireland.  Although the Republic of Ireland is no longer part of the United Kingdom, Northern Ireland is.

There are no symbols representing Wales in the flag, making Wales the only home nation with no direct representation, as at the time of the Laws in Wales Acts 1535 and 1542 (creating legal union with England) the concept of national flags was in its infancy. The Welsh Dragon was however adopted as a supporter in the royal coat of arms of England used by the Tudor dynasty from 1485.

Terminology
The terms Union Jack and Union Flag are both used historically for describing the national flag of the United Kingdom. Whether the term Union Jack applies only when used as a jack flag on a ship is a matter of debate.

According to the website of the Parliament of the United Kingdom: "Until the early 17th century England and Scotland were two entirely independent kingdoms (Wales had been annexed into The Kingdom of England under the Laws in Wales Acts 1535 and 1542). This changed dramatically in 1603 on the death of Elizabeth I of England. Because the Queen died unmarried and childless, the English crown passed to the next available heir, her cousin James VI, King of Scotland. England and Scotland now shared the same monarch under what was known as a union of the crowns." Each kingdom had its own national flag for ships, in 1606 James VI and I introduced a combined national flag. The UK Parliament website states "The result was the Union Jack, Jack being a shortening of Jacobus, the Latin version of James".

The etymology of "Jack" in the context of flagstaffs reaches back to Middle German.  The suffix -kin was used in Middle Dutch and Middle German as a diminutive.  Examples occur in both Chaucer and Langland though the form is unknown in Old English.  John is a common male forename (going back to the Bible), appearing in Dutch as Jan.  Both languages use it as a generic form for a man in general.  The two were combined in the Middle Dutch Janke, whence Middle French Jakke and Middle English Jack.  Jack came to be used to identify all manner of particularly small objects or small versions of larger ones.  The OED has definition 21 "Something insignificant, or smaller than the normal size" and gives examples from 1530 to 2014 of this usage.  Further examples in the compounds section at 2b illustrate this.  The original maritime flag use of jack was "A ship's flag of a smaller size than the ensign, used at sea as a signal, or as an identifying device". The Jack was flown in the bows or from the head of the spritsail mast to indicate the vessel's nationality: "You are alsoe for this present service to keepe in yor Jack at yor Boultspritt end and yor Pendant and yor Ordinance"  The Union Flag when instantiated as a small jack became known as the "Union Jack" and this later term transferred to more general usage of the Union Flag.

Also later a short flagpole was placed in the bows of a ship to fly the jack, this became known as the jackstaff.

According to the Flag Institute, a membership-run vexillological charity, "the national flag of the United Kingdom, the Crown Dependencies and Overseas Territories is the Union Flag, which may also be called the Union Jack." The institute has also stated:  Notwithstanding Their Lordships' circular of 1902, by 1913 the Admiralty described the "Union Flag" and added in a footnote that 'A Jack is a Flag to be flown only on the "Jack" Staff'.

However, the authoritative A Complete Guide to Heraldry published in 1909 by Arthur Charles Fox-Davies uses the term "Union Jack".

The term "Union Flag" is used in King Charles I's 1634 proclamation:

 and in King George III's proclamation of 1 January 1801 concerning the arms and flag of the United Kingdom of Great Britain and Ireland:

When the first flag representing Britain was introduced on the proclamation of King James I in 1606, it became known simply as the "British flag" or the "flag of Britain". The royal proclamation gave no distinctive name to the new flag. The word "jack" was in use before 1600 to describe the maritime bow flag. By 1627 a small Union Jack was commonly flown in this position. One theory goes that for some years it would have been called just the "Jack", or "Jack flag", or the "King's Jack", but by 1674, while formally referred to as "His Majesty's Jack", it was commonly called the "Union Jack", and this was officially acknowledged.

A proclamation issued by King George III at the time of the Union of 1801 concerned flags at sea and repeatedly referred to "Ensigns, Flags, Jacks, and Pendants" and forbade merchant vessels from wearing "Our Jack, commonly called the Union Jack" nor any pendants or colours used by the King's ships.  Reinforcing the distinction the King's proclamation of the same day concerning the arms and flag of the United Kingdom (not colours at sea) called the new flag "the Union Flag".

The size and power of the Royal Navy internationally at the time could also explain why the flag was named the "Union Jack"; considering the navy was so widely utilised and renowned by the United Kingdom and colonies, it is possible that the term jack occurred because of its regular use on all British ships using the jackstaff (a flag pole attached to the bow of a ship). The name may alternatively come from the 'jack-et' of the English or Scottish soldiers, or from the name of James I who originated the first union in 1603. Even if the term "Union Jack" does derive from the jack flag, after three centuries, it is now sanctioned by use and has appeared in official use, confirmed as the national flag by Parliament and remains the popular term.

Winston Churchill, British Prime Minister from 1940 to 1945, referred to the flag of the United Kingdom as the Union Jack. In March 1899, Churchill wrote to his mother from India about her plans to produce a new trans-Atlantic magazine, to be called The Anglo-Saxon Review. The drawing at the end of this letter was deliberately facetious, teasing her for going down-market, and in the accompanying letter he wrote, "Your title 'The Anglo Saxon' with its motto 'Blood is thicker than water' only needs the Union Jack & the Star Spangled Banner crossed on the cover to be suited to one of Harmsworth's cheap Imperialist productions."

More recently, Reed's Nautical Almanac (1990 edition) unambiguously stated: "The Union Flag, frequently but incorrectly referred to as the Union Jack, ..." and later: "8. The Jack– A small flag worn on a jackstaff on the stem of Naval Vessels.  The Royal Navy wears the Union Flag ... This is the only occasion when it correct to describe the flag as the Union Jack". However, this assertion does not appear in any Reed's Nautical Almanac since 1993.  In the 2016 Reed's Nautical Almanac, the only entry where this might appear, section 5.21, covering Flag Etiquette, does not include this statement. Within the Almanac, neither the Union Flag nor the Union Jack are included pictorially or mentioned by name.

For comparison with another anglophone country with a large navy, the Jack of the United States specifically refers to the flag flown from the jackstaff of a warship, auxiliary or other U.S. governmental entity.

The Butcher's Apron is a pejorative term for the flag, common among Irish republicans, citing the blood-streaked appearance of the flag and referring to atrocities committed in Ireland and other countries under British colonial rule. In 2006, Sandra White, a Member of the Scottish Parliament, caused a furore when the term was used in a press release under her name. It was later blamed on the actions of a researcher, who resigned yet claimed that the comment had been approved by White.

In the Chinese language, the flag has the nickname Rice-Character Flag (米字旗; Mandarin Pinyin: mǐzìqí, Cantonese Jyutping: mai5zi6kei4), since the pattern looks like the Chinese character for "rice" (米).

Design 

The current flag's design has been in use since 1801.  Its original blazon, as decreed by George III of the United Kingdom on 1 January 1801, reads: 
"the Union flag shall be azure, the crosses-saltires of St. Andrew and St. Patrick quartered per saltire counter changed argent and gules; the latter fimbriated of the second  [viz., argent]; surmounted by the cross of St. George of the third [viz., gules], fimbriated as the saltire [viz., argent]."

Specification
The Union Jack is normally twice as long as it is tall, a ratio of 1:2. In the United Kingdom, land flags are normally a ratio of 3:5; the Union Jack can also be made in this shape, but 1:2 is for most purposes. In 2008, MP Andrew Rosindell proposed a Ten Minute Rule bill to standardise the design of the flag at 3:5, but the bill did not proceed past the first reading.

The three-component crosses that make up the Union Flag are sized as follows:
According to the official blazon of 1801, the white diagonal St Andrew's Cross is in fact counterchanged with the red diagonal of St Patrick's Cross.

The crosses and fimbriations retain their thickness relative to the flag's height whether they are shown with a ratio of 3:5 or 1:2. Height here is the distance from top to bottom which in vexillology is termed width or breadth.

Ratios

The Admiralty in 1864 settled all official flags at proportions of 1:2, but the relative widths of the crosses remained unspecified, with the above conventions becoming standardised in the 20th century. In the 19th century, the Union flag was defined by the same blazon but could vary in its geometrical proportions.

Although the most common ratio is 1:2, other ratios exist. The Royal Navy's flag code book, BR20 Flags of All Nations, states that both 1:2 and 3:5 versions are official. The 3:5 version In this version, the innermost points of the lower left and upper right diagonals of the St Patrick's cross are cut off or truncated. The Garter King of Arms also suggests a ratio of 3:5 as the suitable proportion for a Union Flag flown on land.

The Queen's Harbour Master's flag, like the Pilot Jack, is a 1:2 flag that contains a white-bordered Union Flag that is longer than 1:2. The jacks of ships flying variants of the Blue Ensign are square and have a square Union Flag in the canton.

In South Africa, the Union Jacks flown alongside the National Flag between 1928 and 1957 were 2:3 flags.

Colours
The colour specifications for the colours blue, red, and white are:

All HEX, CMYK and RGB specifications for the Pantone colours are taken from the official Pantone website on the webpages of the corresponding colours. Although the colour schemes are official, not all of the colours are completely congruent. This is due to different specifications for different types of media (for example, screen and print).

Flying

The flag does not have reflection symmetry due to the slight pinwheeling of the St Patrick's and St Andrew's crosses, technically the counterchange of saltires. Thus, there is a correct side up. The flag does have two-fold rotational symmetry, though. The original specification of the Union Flag in the Royal Proclamation of 1 January 1801 did not contain a drawn pattern or express which way the saltires should lie; they were simply "counterchanged" and the red saltire fimbriated. Nevertheless, a convention was soon established which accords most closely with the description.  The flag was deliberately designed with the Irish saltire slightly depressed at the hoist end to reflect the earlier union with Scotland, giving as it were seniority to the Saint Andrew's cross.

When statically displayed, the hoist is on the observer's left. To fly the flag correctly, the white of St Andrew is above the red of St Patrick in the upper hoist canton (the quarter at the top nearest to the flag-pole). This is expressed by the phrases wide white top and broadside up. Note that an upside-down flag must be turned over to be flown correctly, rotating it 180 degrees will still result in an upside-down flag.

The first drawn pattern for the flag was in a parallel proclamation on 1 January 1801, concerning civil naval ensigns, which drawing shows the red ensign (also to be used as a red jack by privateers).  As it appears in the London Gazette, the broad stripe is where expected for three of the four quarters, but the upper left quarter shows the broad stripe below.

It is often stated that a flag upside down is a form of distress signal or even a deliberate insult. In the case of the Union Flag, the difference is subtle and is easily missed by the uninformed. It is often displayed upside down inadvertently—even on commercially-made hand waving flags.

On 3 February 2009, the BBC reported that the flag had been inadvertently flown upside-down by the UK government at the signing of a trade agreement with Chinese premier Wen Jiabao. The error had been spotted by readers of the BBC News website who had contacted the BBC after seeing a photograph of the event.

History
In 1603, James VI of Scotland inherited the Kingdom of England (and the newly created client state, the Kingdom of Ireland) as James I, thereby uniting the crowns in a personal union. With Wales annexed into the Kingdom of England under the Laws in Wales Acts 1535 and 1542, James now ruled over all of the island of Great Britain, which he frequently described as a unified kingdom (though the parliaments of the Kingdom of England and the Kingdom of Scotland did not actually unify until the Kingdom of Great Britain was formed in 1707). In the wake of the 1603 personal union, several designs for a new flag were drawn up, juxtaposing the Saint George's Cross and the St Andrew's Saltire, but none were acceptable to James:

Various other designs for a common flag were drawn up following the union of the two Crowns in 1603, but were rarely, if ever, used. One version showed St George's cross with St Andrew's cross in the canton, and another version placed the two crosses side by side. A painted wooden ceiling boss from Linlithgow Palace, dated to about 1617, depicts the Scottish royal unicorn holding a flag where a blue Saltire surmounts the red cross of St. George.

1606–1801

On 12 April 1606, a new flag to represent the regal union between England and Scotland was specified in a royal decree, according to which the flag of England (a red cross on a white background, known as St George's Cross), and the flag of Scotland (a white saltire on a blue background, known as the saltire or St Andrew's Cross), would be joined together, forming the flag of Great Britain and first union flag:

This royal flag was, at first, to be used only at sea on civil and military ships of both England and Scotland, whereas land forces continued to use their respective national banners. Flying the national flag at the mainmast had signified the Admiral of the Narrow Seas (the English Channel) and confusion arose. In 1634, King Charles I restricted its use to Royal Navy ships. After the Acts of Union 1707, the flag gained a regularised status as "the ensign armorial of the Kingdom of Great Britain", the newly created state. It was then adopted by land forces as well, although the blue field used on land-based versions more closely resembled that of the blue of the flag of Scotland.

Various shades of blue have been used in the saltire over the years. The ground of the current Union Flag is a deep "navy" blue (Pantone 280), which can be traced to the colour used for the Blue Ensign of the Royal Navy's historic "Blue Squadron". (Dark shades of colour were used on maritime flags on the basis of durability.) In 2003 a committee of the Scottish Parliament recommended that the flag of Scotland use a lighter "royal" blue (Pantone 300) (the Office of the Lord Lyon does not detail specific shades of colour for use in heraldry).

A thin white stripe, or fimbriation, separates the red cross from the blue field, in accordance with heraldry's rule of tincture where colours (like red and blue) must be separated from each other by metals (like white, i.e. argent or silver). The blazon for the old union flag, to be compared with the current flag, is azure, the cross saltire of St Andrew argent surmounted by the Cross of St George gules, fimbriated of the second.

The Kingdom of Ireland, which had existed as a personal union with England since 1541, was unrepresented in the original versions of the Union Jack. However, the flag of the Protectorate from 1658 to 1660 was inescutcheoned with the arms of Ireland. These were removed at the Restoration, because Charles II disliked them.

The original flag appears in the canton of the Commissioners' Ensign of the Northern Lighthouse Board. This is the only contemporary official representation of the pre-1801 Union Jack in the United Kingdom and can be seen flying from their George Street headquarters in Edinburgh.

This version of the Union Jack is also shown in the canton of the Grand Union Flag (also known as the Congress Flag, the First Navy Ensign, the Cambridge Flag and the Continental Colours), the first widely used flag of the United States, slowly phased out after 1777.

The actual flag, preserved in the National Maritime Museum, is a cruder approximation of the proper specifications; this was common in 18th and early 19th century flags.

The flag is also flown beside Customs House in Loftus Street, Sydney, to mark the approximate location at which Captain Phillip first raised the Union Jack, and claimed New South Wales in 1788. On the plaque it is referred to as the "Jack of Queen Anne".

The British Army's flag is the Union Jack, but in 1938, a "British Army Non-Ceremonial Flag" was devised, featuring a lion on crossed blades with the St Edward's Crown on a red background. This is not the equivalent of the ensigns of the other armed services but is used at recruiting and military or sporting events, when the army needs to be identified but the reverence and ceremony due to the regimental flags and the Union Jack would be inappropriate.

Scottish Union Flag

In objecting to the design of the Union Flag adopted in 1606, whereby the cross of Saint George surmounted that of Saint Andrew, a group of Scots took up the matter with John Erskine, 19th Earl of Mar, and were encouraged by him to send a letter of complaint to James VI, via the Privy Council of Scotland, which stated that the flag's design "will breid some heit and miscontentment betwix your Majesties subjectis, and it is to be feirit that some inconvenientis sail fall oute betwix thame, for our seyfaring men cannot be inducit to resave that flage as it is set down". Although documents accompanying this complaint which contained drafts for alternative designs have been lost, evidence exists, at least on paper, of an unofficial Scottish variant, whereby the Scottish cross was uppermost. There is reason to think that cloth flags of this design were employed during the 17th century for unofficial use on Scottish vessels at sea. This flag's design is also described in the 1704 edition of The Present State of the Universe by John Beaumont, which contains as an appendix The Ensigns, Colours or Flags of the Ships at Sea: Belonging to The several Princes and States in the World.

On land, evidence confirming the use of this flag appears in the depiction of Edinburgh Castle by John Slezer, in his series of engravings entitled Theatrum Scotiae, c. 1693. Appearing in later editions of Theatrum Scotiae, the North East View of Edinburgh Castle engraving depicts the Scotch (to use the appropriate adjective of that period) version of the Union Flag flying from the Palace block of the Castle. On The North Prospect of the City of Edenburgh engraving, the flag is indistinct.

On 17 April 1707, just two weeks prior to the Acts of Union coming into effect, and with Sir Henry St George, the younger, the Garter King of Arms, having presented several designs of flag to Queen Anne and her Privy Council for consideration, the flag for the soon to be unified Kingdom of Great Britain was chosen. At the suggestion of the Scots representatives, the designs for consideration included that version of Union Jack showing the Cross of Saint Andrew uppermost; identified as being the "Scotts union flagg as said to be used by the Scotts". However, the Queen and her Council approved Sir Henry's original effort, numbered "one".

A manuscript compiled in 1785 by William Fox and in possession of the Flag Research Center includes a full plate showing "the scoth  union" flag. This could imply that there was still some use of a Scottish variant before the addition of the cross of St Patrick to the Union Flag in 1801.

After 1801 

The current and second Union Jack dates from 1 January 1801 with the Act of Union 1800, which merged the Kingdom of Great Britain and the Kingdom of Ireland to form the United Kingdom of Great Britain and Ireland. The new design added a red saltire, the cross of Saint Patrick, for Ireland. This is counterchanged with the saltire of St Andrew, such that the red always follows the white clockwise. The arrangement has introduced a requirement to display the flag "the right way up" (see specifications for flag use above). As with the red cross, so too the red saltire is separated by a white fimbriation from the blue field. This fimbriation is repeated for symmetry on the white portion of the saltire, which thereby appears wider than the red portion. The fimbriation of the cross of St George separates its red from the red of the saltire.

Apart from the Union Jack, Saint Patrick's cross has seldom been used to represent Ireland, and with little popular recognition or enthusiasm; it is usually considered to derive from the arms of the powerful FitzGerald family rather than any association with the saint.

Flag speculation after Irish Free State establishment
When the Anglo-Irish Treaty was concluded on 6 December 1921 and the creation of the new Irish Free State was an imminent prospect, the question arose as to whether the cross of Saint Patrick should remain in the Union Jack. The New York Times reported that on 22 January 1922:
 

There was some speculation on the matter in British dominions also, with one New Zealand paper reporting that:

However, the fact that it was likely that Northern Ireland would remain in the United Kingdom gave better grounds for keeping the cross of St. Patrick in the Union Jack. In this regard, Sir James Craig, the Prime Minister of Northern Ireland remarked in December 1921 that he and his government were "glad to think that our decision [to remain part of United Kingdom] will obviate the necessity of mutilating the Union Jack." Though remaining within the United Kingdom, the new government of Northern Ireland dispensed with the St Patrick's Saltire in favour of a new flag derived from the coat-of-arms of the Burkes, Earls of Ulster, and quite similar to England's St George's Cross.

Ultimately, when the British home secretary was asked on 7 December 1922 (the day after the Irish Free State was established) whether the Garter King of Arms was "to issue any Regulations with reference to the national flag consequent to the passing of the Irish Free State Constitution Act", the response was no and the flag has never been changed.

A Dáil question in 1961 mooted raising the removal of the cross of St Patrick with the British government; Frank Aiken, the Irish Minister for External Affairs, declined to "waste time on heraldic disputations".

21st century
In 2003, a private individual started a campaign – dubbed "reflag" or "Union Black" – to introduce black stripes in the Union Jack in order to represent the increasing diversity in the United Kingdom. The proposal was universally met with opposition and was denounced by MSP Phil Gallie as "ridiculous tokenism [that] would do nothing to stamp out racism". The campaign is now defunct.

The lack of any Welsh symbol or colours in the flag is a result of Wales having been considered an integral part of the Kingdom of England at the time the flag of Great Britain was created in 1606. Since there is no Welsh element in the Union Jack, Wrexham's Labour MP Ian Lucas proposed on 26 November 2007 in a House of Commons debate that the Union Flag be combined with the Welsh flag to reflect Wales's status within the UK, and that the red dragon be added to the Union Flag's red, white, and blue pattern. He said the Union Jack currently only represented the other three UK nations, and Minister for Culture, Creative Industries and Tourism Margaret Hodge conceded that Lucas had raised a valid point for debate. She said, "the Government is keen to make the Union Flag a positive symbol of Britishness reflecting the diversity of our country today and encouraging people to take pride in our flag." This development sparked design contests with entries from all over the world.

In the run-up to the 2014 Scottish independence referendum, various non-official suggestions were made for how the flag could be redesigned without the St Andrew's Cross if Scotland left the Union. However, as Scotland voted against independence the issue did not arise.

Status in the United Kingdom

The Union Jack is used as a jack by commissioned warships and submarines of the Royal Navy, and by commissioned army and Royal Air Force vessels. When at anchor or alongside, it is flown from the jackstaff at the bow of the ship. When a ship is underway, the Union Jack is only flown from the jackstaff when the ship is dressed for a special occasion, such as the King's official birthday.

The Union Flag is worn at the masthead of a ship to indicate the presence of the Sovereign or an Admiral of the Fleet. The Union Flag may also be flown from the yardarm to indicate that a court-martial is in progress, though these are now normally held at shore establishments.

No law has been passed making the Union Jack the national flag of the United Kingdom: it has become one through precedent. Its first recorded recognition as a national flag came in 1908, when it was stated in Parliament that "the Union Jack should be regarded as the National flag". A more categorical statement was made by Home Secretary Sir John Gilmour, in 1933 when he stated that "the Union Flag is the national flag and may properly be flown by any British subject on land."

Civilian use is permitted on land, but use of the unmodified flag at sea is restricted to military vessels. Unauthorised use of the flag in the 17th century to avoid paying harbour duties – a privilege restricted to naval ships – caused James's successor, Charles I, to order that use of the flag on naval vessels be restricted to His Majesty's ships "upon pain of Our high displeasure." It remains a criminal offence under the Merchant Shipping Act 1995 to display the Union Flag (other than the "pilot jack" – see below) from a British ship. Naval ships will fly the white ensign, merchant and private boats can fly the red ensign, others with special permission such as naval yacht clubs can fly the blue ensign. All of the coloured ensigns contain the union flag as part of the design.

The Court of the Lord Lyon, which has legal jurisdiction in heraldic matters in Scotland, confirms that the Union Jack "is the correct flag for all citizens and corporate bodies of the United Kingdom to fly to demonstrate their loyalty and their nationality."

On 5 February 2008, Conservative Member of Parliament (MP) Andrew Rosindell introduced the 'Union Flag Bill' as a private member's bill under the 10 Minute Rule in the House of Commons. The Bill sought to formalise the position of the Union Flag as the national flag of the UK in law, to remove legal obstacles to its regular display.  The Bill did not receive its second reading by the end of that parliamentary session.  The Bill stated "Union flag (commonly known as the Union Jack)" in subsection 1(1), but otherwise uses the term "Union Flag".

Flag days

In July 2007, then-Prime Minister Gordon Brown unveiled plans to have the Union Flag flown more often from government buildings. While consultation on new guidelines was under way, the decision to fly the flag could be made by each government department. In March 2021, the UK government published new guidance for the Union Flag to be flown all year round on UK government buildings, unless another flag is being flown – such as another national flag of the UK, or a county flag, or other flags to mark civic pride.

Previously, the flag was generally only flown on public buildings on days marking the birthdays of members of the Royal Family, the wedding anniversary of the monarch, Commonwealth Day, Accession Day, Coronation Day, the monarch's official birthday, Remembrance Sunday, and on the days of the State Opening and prorogation of Parliament. Non-government organisations were (and are) permitted to fly the Union Flag whenever they choose.

The last specified set of flag days where the Union Flag should be flown from government buildings throughout the UK were:

 9 January (Birthday of The Princess of Wales)
 20 January (Birthday of The Duchess of Edinburgh)
 19 February (Birthday of The Duke of York)
 Second Monday in March (Commonwealth Day)
 10 March (Birthday of The Duke of Edinburgh)
 9 April (The King and Queen's Wedding Anniversary)
 Second Saturday in June (The King's Official Birthday)
 21 June (Birthday of The Prince of Wales)
 17 July (Birthday of The Queen)
 4 August (Birthday of The Duchess of Sussex)
 15 August (Birthday of The Princess Royal)
 8 September (Anniversary of the accession of The King)
 15 September (Birthday of The Duke of Sussex)
 Second Sunday in November (Remembrance Sunday)
 14 November (The King's Birthday)

 it is expected that the King's coronation will be on 6 May 2023 which will then become the new coronation flag day.

In addition, the Union Flag was to be flown on the following days in specified areas:

 1 March (Wales only, for St David's Day)
 17 March (Northern Ireland only, for St Patrick's Day)
 23 April (England only, for St George's Day)
 The Day of the Opening of a Session of the Houses of Parliament, Greater London only
 The day of the prorogation of a Session of the Houses of Parliament, Greater London only

The Union Flag is flown at half mast from the announcement of the death of the Sovereign (save for Proclamation Day), or upon command of the Sovereign.

On 30 November, (St Andrew's Day), the Union Flag can be flown in Scotland only where a building has more than one flagpole—on this day the Saltire will not be lowered to make way for the Union Flag if there is only one flagpole. This difference arose after Members of the Scottish Parliament complained that Scotland was the only country in the world that could not fly its national flag on its national day. However, on 23 April, St George's Day, it is the Union Flag of the United Kingdom that is flown over UK government offices in England.

Usage and disposal
The Union Flag has no official status in the United Kingdom, and there are no national regulations concerning its use or prohibitions against flag desecration. In Northern Ireland, the Flags Regulations (Northern Ireland) 2000 provide for the flying of the flag on government buildings on certain occasions, when it is flown half-mast, and how it is displayed with other flags.

The Flags and Heraldry Committee, an all-party parliamentary group lobbying for official standards, cooperated with the Flag Institute in 2010 to publish a set of recommended guidelines for the flag's display and use as a symbol.

There is no specific way in which the Union Flag should be folded as there is with the United States Flag. It is usually folded rectilinearly, with the hoist on the outside, to be easily reattached to the pole.

Royal Navy Stores Duties Instructions, article 447, dated 26 February 1914, specified that flags condemned from further service use were to be torn up into small pieces and disposed of as rags (ADM 1/8369/56), not to be used for decoration or sold. The exception was flags that had flown in action: these could be framed and kept on board, or transferred to a "suitable place", such as a museum (ADM 1/8567/245).

Position of Honour 

According to the UK Flag Protocol, the order of precedence of flags in the United Kingdom is: the Royal Standards, the Union Flag, the flag of the host country (England, Scotland and Wales etc.), the flags of other nations (in English alphabetical order), the Commonwealth Flag, the county flags, the flags of cities or towns, the banners of arms, and the house flags.

British Overseas Territories and Crown Dependencies 

The Union Jack is the national flag of the British Overseas Territories, which are parts of the British realm with varying degrees of local autonomy. Most populated administrative regions and territories of the United Kingdom have been granted a unique flag for the locality, usually the Blue ensign or Red ensign defaced with the distinguishing arms of the territory. All fly the Union Jack in some form, with the exception of Gibraltar (other than the government ensign).

The Crown Dependencies, unlike the British Overseas Territories, are legally not part of the United Kingdom, and the Union Jack is not an official flag there. Outside the UK, the Union Jack is usually part of a special ensign in which it is placed in the upper left hand corner of a blue field, with a signifying crest in the bottom right. When the Union Jack and the territorial flag are flown together, the national flag is always arranged to take precedence over the territorial flag.

Status outside the United Kingdom

Australia

The Union Flag was used as a flag of Australia until 1953, although the Australian blue ensign saw use as a governmental flag of Australia, and an informal national flag of the country since the early 20th century. From 1911 to 1956, schools in South Australia were required to fly the Union Jack for the "national salute".

In 1953, the Australian blue ensign was named the national flag of Australia, through the Flags Act 1953. Although the Australian blue ensign replaced the Union Jack as the flag of Australia, Australian prime minister Robert Menzies told Australians that the Union Flag would be flown together with the Australian national flag "on notable occasions". Section 8 of that Flag Act also specified that the formalization of the Australian blue ensign as the national flag did "not affect the right or privilege of a person to fly the Union Jack." The Union Jack continued to see informal use as a flag of Australia for a period thereafter, although by the 1980s, the majority of Australians viewed the Australian blue ensign as the national flag as opposed to the Union Jack.

Canada

The Union Jack was the official national flag of Canada until 1965 when it was replaced in that role by the Maple Leaf flag. Since 1965, the Union Jack in Canada is used as an authorised symbol to represent Canada's "membership in the Commonwealth of Nations and its allegiance to the Crown".

History
The Union Jack has been used in a variety of colonies in British North America since its official adoption in 1707, In 1867, the British North American colonies of New Brunswick, Nova Scotia, and the Province of Canada were united to form the Canadian Confederation; with the Union Jack being retained as the official flag of the new "confederation".

In addition to the Union Jack, during the late 19th century, a red ensign defaced with the arms of Canada was also used as an informal flag of Canada. The defaced red ensign, later known as the Canadian Red Ensign, was eventually authorised for official use as the country's civil ensign in 1892. Although the Canadian Red Ensign was only formally authorised as a civil ensign, it was also viewed as a de facto national flag, as it was a uniquely Canadian symbol.

In 1964, Canadian Prime Minister Lester B. Pearson introduced plans to replace the Union Flag with a new national flag, spurring the Great Canadian flag debate. A new national flag, the Maple Leaf, was approved by the parliament of Canada on 17 December 1964. However, on the following day, the Canadian parliament passed another resolution that designated the Union Flag as the Royal Union Flag and authorised its official use as the symbol of the country's membership in the Commonwealth of Nations and its allegiance to the Crown. The move was a concession given to those who preferred to adopt the Canadian Red Ensign as a formal national flag. On 15 February 1965, the maple leaf flag formally replaced the Union Flag as the flag of Canada following an official proclamation by Elizabeth II, with the Royal Union Flag becoming an official ceremonial flag.

The Union Flag was also the formal flag for the Dominion of Newfoundland, a separate dominion of the British Empire from 1907 to 1949. Newfoundland retained the Union Flag as the province's official flag after it joined the Canadian confederation in 1949. In 1980, the flag of Newfoundland was adopted as the new provincial flag, with the design for the new flag of Newfoundland being derived from the Union Flag.

Protocol
The parliamentary resolution passed on 18 December 1964 assigned two purposes for the Royal Union Flag: a flag representing the United Kingdom and an official ceremonial flag of Canada. When used to represent the United Kingdom, the flag takes precedence before the flag of a Canadian province or territory. However, when the flag is used as a ceremonial flag of Canada, the flag of a Canadian province or territory takes precedence before the Royal Union Flag.

The parliamentary resolution requires the Royal Union Flag to be flown alongside the national flag of Canada (if there are at least two flag poles available) on federal properties on Commonwealth Day, Victoria Day (the monarch's official birthday in Canada), 11 December (the anniversary of the enactment of the Statute of Westminster, 1931), and when otherwise instructed to do so by the National Defence Headquarters. The Royal Union Flag may also be formally flown alongside the flag of Canada at federal locations in Canada for ceremonies, anniversaries, and other events relating to the Canadian Armed Forces or other forces in the Commonwealth.

Items and properties that the parliamentary resolution applies to includes buildings operated by the federal government, military installations, federally-operated airports, at the masthead of Royal Canadian Navy ships within Canadian waters, and other appropriate establishments. The requirement for federal properties to fly the Royal Union Flag applies only when there are two or more flagpoles on the property, to ensure that the national flag of Canada is not taken down in place of the Royal Union Flag.

New Zealand

The Union Flag became the flag of New Zealand after the Treaty of Waitangi was signed in February 1840, replacing the flag used by the United Tribes of New Zealand. The issue of flying the flag of the United Tribes alongside the Union Jack, as a symbol of their equal standing with the colonial government, served as a factor that led to the Flagstaff War, led by Ngāpuhi chief Hōne Heke. British maritime flags were used by New Zealand vessels until 1865, with the passage of the Colonial Naval Defence Act 1865. After which, vessels of the New Zealand government used a defaced blue ensign issued by the colonial government.

The current national flag of New Zealand was given official standing under the New Zealand Ensign Act in 1902, replacing the Union Flag. However, the Union Flag continued to see tandem use with the national flag of New Zealand into the 1950s.

South Africa
The Union Jack was introduced into South Africa in 1795, and except for the period 1803–06, it was an official flag until 1957.

When the Union of South Africa was established in 1910, the Union Jack was treated as its official flag.

The continued use of the Union Jack as national flag became an issue in the 1920s, when the government proposed to introduce a National Flag of the Union.  A compromise was reached in which both flags were flown on official buildings.  The Union Nationality and Flags Act 1927 provided that the flags of the Union were (a) the Union Jack, to denote the association with the other members of the British Commonwealth of Nations, and (b) the new National Flag.  The Union Jack was to be flown alongside the National Flag at the Houses of Parliament, from the principal government buildings in the capitals, at Union ports, on government offices abroad, and at such other places as the government might determine.  This dual arrangement was effective from 31 May 1928.

Instructions issued in 1931 confirmed the places where both flags were to be flown.  In addition to those already mentioned, they were the Union Buildings (Pretoria), the head offices of the four provincial administrations, the supreme courts, certain magistrates' courts, customs houses, and three buildings in Durban (the general post office, the railway station, and the local military district headquarters).

Under these arrangements, the Union Jack was subordinate to the National Flag.  As the two flags had to be the same size, it meant that the Union Jack was made in the ratio 2:3 rather than the usual 1:2.

The flying of the Union Jack alongside the National Flag ended on 6 April 1957.

Use outside the Commonwealth
Several individuals residing in countries not a part of the Commonwealth of Nations have adopted the Union Flag as a flag of protest. After the British referendum on membership of the European Union resulted in a vote to leave, the Union Flag had become a symbol of euroscepticism in Italy. In August 2016, many local businesses along the Italian riviera hoisted the flags as a protest against the implementation of the Services in the Internal Market Directive 2006.

Hong Kong
The Union Flag was formerly used in Hong Kong when it was a British Dependent Territory. Official use of the Union Flag and the British colonial Hong Kong flag ceased following the handover of Hong Kong to China in July 1997. In the 2010s, the Union Flag, along with the colonial flag of Hong Kong began to see use by supporters of the pro-democracy camp during the 2014 Hong Kong protests, and the 2019–20 Hong Kong protests. The flag has been displayed at other pro-democracy events in Hong Kong, including the new year marches and the 1 July marches. Members of the Hong Kong Autonomy Movement, the Hong Kong independence movement and Hong Kong localists have been seen wielding the Union Flag or the colonial flag of Hong Kong.

However, the meaning behind the use of the flags by pro-democracy protestors, including the Union Flag, remains disputed with protestors citing a variety of reasons for flying it. Some pro-democracy protestors that flew foreign flags, including the Union Flag, did so in an effort to attract international media attention to the protests, while others did so in an effort to irritate the central government of China.  The Union Flag, in addition to other foreign flags, were also used by some protestors to illustrate their desire for Hong Kong to be an "international city"; whereas others used the flag simply as a generic symbol of freedom.

Some specifically flew the Union Flag and the colonial flag of Hong Kong, nostalgic of the "values" of the previous colonial government, namely "personal freedoms, rule of law, [and] clean governance". Other pro-democracy protestors choose to use the Union Flag and the colonial flag of Hong Kong in an effort to call upon the British government to declare that China had failed to uphold the Sino-British Joint Declaration.  Several Hongkongers that hold British National (Overseas) passports who used the flag during the protests were doing so as a call to the British government to grant British National (Overseas) the right to abode in the United Kingdom. Although a small number of Hongkongers seek direct British intervention into the matter, the majority of those that used the Union Flag or the colonial flag of Hong Kong during the protests do not hold such beliefs.

The use of foreign flags at the protests, including the Union Flag, has been cited multiple times by the central government of China as evidence for their claim that foreign interference is steering the protests in Hong Kong against the central government. Conversely, several protestors in the pro-democracy camp have also been criticized the use of foreign flags, who view their use as reinforcing the claims made by the central government of China.

Use in other flags

National and regional flags

As the national flag of the entire British Realm, the Union Flag was found in the canton (upper flagpole-side quarter) of the flags of many colonies of Britain, while the field (background) of their flags was the colour of the naval ensign flown by the particular Royal Navy squadron that patrolled that region of the world. Nations and colonies that have used the Union Flag at some stage have included Aden, Basutoland (now Lesotho), Barbados, Bechuanaland (now Botswana), Borneo, Burma, Canada, Ceylon (now Sri Lanka), Cyprus, Dominica, British East Africa (Kenya Colony), Gambia, Gold Coast (Ghana), Grenada, Guiana, Hong Kong, Jamaica, Labuan (Malaysia), Lagos, Malta, Mauritius, Nigeria, Palestine, Penang (Malaysia), Rhodesia (now Zimbabwe), Sierra Leone, Singapore, Somaliland, South Africa, Anglo-Egyptian Sudan, Pre-partitioned India (present-day India, Pakistan, Bangladesh, and Myanmar), Tanganyika, Trinidad and Tobago, Uganda, the United States, and Weihaiwei. As former British Empire nations were granted independence, these and other versions of the Union Flag were decommissioned. The most recent decommissioning of the Union Flag came on 1 July 1997, when the former Dependent Territory of Hong Kong was handed over to the People's Republic of China.

Four former British colonies in Oceania which are now independent countries incorporate the Union Jack as part of their national flags: Australia, New Zealand and Tuvalu, which have retained the monarchy; and Fiji, which abolished the monarchy in 1987.

In former British colonies, the Union Jack was used interchangeably with informal flags of the territory for significant parts of their colonial early history. The Union Flag was used as the flag of Canada until it was re-adopted as a ceremonial flag, and the Maple Leaf flag made the official national flag in 1965. In addition to being an official ceremonial flag, the Union Flag also defaces the flags of a number of Canadian provinces, including British Columbia, Manitoba, and Ontario. Newfoundland and Labrador uses a flag that was derived from the Union Flag, with the Union Jack serving as the flag of Newfoundland until 1980. The Union Flag, and flags defaced with the Union Flag in its canton, like the Canadian Red Ensign, continue to see use in Canada in a private capacity. The pre-1801 Union Flag also sees limited use by private organizations, most notably the United Empire Loyalists Association of Canada.

Along with the national flag, many other Australian flags retain the use of the Union Jack, including the Royal Australian Navy Ensign (also known as the Australian White Ensign), the Royal Australian Air Force Ensign, the Australian Red Ensign (for use by merchant and private vessels), and the Australian Civil Aviation Ensign. The flags of all six Australian States retain the Union Jack in the canton, as do some regional flags such as the Upper and Lower Murray River Flags. The Vice-Regal flags of the State Governors also use the Union Jack. While the Flags Act 1953 states that Australians still have the "right or privilege" to fly the Union Jack after the introduction of the Australian National Flag, usage of the Union Jack by itself is unusual.

The Basque Country's flag, the Ikurriña, is also loosely based on the Union Jack, reflecting the significant commercial ties between Bilbao and Britain at the time the Ikurriña was designed in 1894. The Miskito people sometimes use a similar flag that also incorporates the Union Jack in its canton, due to long periods of contact in the Mosquito Coast.

The Union Jack was used by the United States in its first flag, the Grand Union Flag. This flag was of a similar design to the one used by the British East India Company. Hawaii, a state of the United States but located in the central Pacific, incorporates the Union Jack in its state flag. According to one story, the King of Hawaii asked the British mariner, George Vancouver, during a stop in Lahaina, what the piece of cloth flying from his ship was. Vancouver replied that it represented his king's authority. The Hawaiian king then adopted and flew the flag as a symbol of his own royal authority not recognising its national derivation. Hawaii's flag represents the only current use of the Union Jack in any American state flag.

Also in the United States, the Union Flag of 1606 is incorporated into the flag of Baton Rouge, the capital city of Louisiana. Baton Rouge was a British colony from the time of the Seven Years' War until the end of the American Revolutionary War, when it was captured by Spanish forces. Symbols from the colonial powers France and Spain are also incorporated into the Baton Rouge flag. Taunton, Massachusetts, uses a flag with the old style Union Flag by a resolution on 19 October 1974.  Likewise, Westmoreland County, Pennsylvania, has been known to fly a flag containing the King's Colours since 1973.

The Union Jack also appeared on both the 1910–1928 and 1928–1994 flags of South Africa. The 1910–1928 flag was a Red Ensign with the Union coat of arms in the fly. The 1928–1994 flag, based on the Prinsenvlag and commonly known as the oranje-blanje-blou (orange-white-blue), contained the Union Jack as part of a central motif at par with the flags of the two Boer republics of the Orange Free State and Transvaal. To keep any one of the three flags from having precedence, the Union Jack is spread horizontally from the Orange Free State flag towards the hoist; closest to the hoist, it is in the superior position but since it is reversed it does not precede the other flags.

The flag of the Municipal Council of Shanghai International Settlement in 1869 contained multiple flags to symbolize the countries have participated in the creation and management of this enclave in the Chinese city of Shanghai. The Union Jack was contained as part of top left hand shield and close to the flags of the United States and France, there was also contained the flag of Prussia, but it was removed around 1917.

The flag of the Chilean city of Coquimbo features the Union Jack, owing to its historical commercial links to Britain.

Ensigns

The Union Flag can be found in the canton of several of the ensigns flown by vessels and aircraft of the United Kingdom and its overseas territories. These are used in cases where it is illegal to fly the Union Flag, such as at sea from a ship other than a British warship. Normal practice for British ships is to fly the White ensign (Royal Navy), the Red ensign (Merchant and private boats) or the Blue ensign (government departments and public corporations). Similar ensigns are used by other countries (such as New Zealand and Australia) with the Union Flag in the canton. Other Commonwealth countries (such as India and Jamaica) may follow similar ensign etiquette as the UK, replacing the Union Flag with their own national flag.

Others

The flag in a white border occasionally seen on merchant ships was sometimes referred to as the Pilot Jack. It can be traced back to 1823 when it was created as a signal flag, but not intended as a civil jack. A book issued to British consuls in 1855 states that the white bordered Union Flag is to be hoisted for a pilot. Although there was some ambiguity regarding the legality of it being flown for any other purpose on civilian vessels, its use as an ensign or jack was established well in advance of the 1864 Act that designated the Red Ensign for merchant shipping. In 1970, the white-bordered Union Flag ceased to be the signal for a pilot, but references to it as national colours were not removed from the current Merchant Shipping Act and it was legally interpreted as a flag that could be flown on a merchant ship, as a jack if desired. This status was confirmed to an extent by the Merchant Shipping (Registration, etc.) Act 1993 and the consolidating Merchant Shipping Act 1995 which, in Section 4, Subsection 1, prohibits the use of any distinctive national colours or those used or resembling flags or pendants on Her Majesty's Ships, "except the Red Ensign, the Union flag (commonly known as the Union Jack) with a white border", and some other exceptions permitted elsewhere in the Acts. However, Section 2 regards the "British flag", and states that "The flag which every British ship is entitled to fly is the Red Ensign (without any defacement or modification) and, subject to (a warrant from Her Majesty or from the Secretary of State, or an Order of Council from her Majesty regarding a defaced Red Ensign), no other colours." The Flag Institute listed the white bordered Union Flag as "Civil Jack".

The Hudson's Bay Company (HBC) was one of a few non-government institutions using the Union Jack in part of the flag. HBC rival North West Company had a similar flag as well. The HBC Red Ensign is no longer in use in 1965 and replaced with a corporate flag featuring the company's coat of arms.

The Union Jack is the third quarter of the 1939 coat of arms of Alabama, which is used on the flag of the Governor of Alabama, representing British sovereignty over the state prior to 1783. The version used is the modern flag, whereas the 1707 flag would have been used in colonial Alabama.

In the former International Settlement of Kulangsu the Kulangsu Municipal Police had a badge contained multiple flags, including the Union Flag. Then the badge is incorporated in their police flag.

In popular culture

The Union Jack remains one of the most instantly-recognisable flags in the world. This is chiefly due not only to its iconic and unusual design, but the influence of British culture across the globe as a result of the British Empire, and its resulting presence in several Commonwealth nations' flags and heraldry. While most of the former colonies of the British Empire have chosen to omit the Union Jack in their national flags, some countries such as Australia and New Zealand have chosen to keep the Union Jack as a symbol of their British heritage.

The Union Flag has been a prominent symbol in the sphere of fashion since the British Invasion movement of the 1960s, in a similar manner to the American Stars and Stripes flag, and came back into fashion in the mid-1990s 'Cool Britannia' era, notably Spice Girl Geri Halliwell's iconic Union Jack dress of the 1997 Brit Awards. A notable increase in popularity was seen in Cuba following the 2012 London Olympics, with clothing, nail decoration, tattoos, and hairstyles in youths being observed featuring the pattern.

Subsumation in corporate branding
Commonly the Union Flag is used on computer software and Internet pages as an icon representing a choice of the English language where a choice among multiple languages may be presented to the user, though the American flag is also sometimes used for this purpose. The flag has been embroidered on various Reebok equipment as a mark of the brand's British origin, and the Reebok Union Jack has been referred to as a brand icon. Many music artists have used the Union Jack, ranging from rock artists The Rolling Stones, The Who, The Jam, Sex Pistols, The Stone Roses, David Bowie, John Lennon, Paul McCartney, Freddie Mercury, Morrissey, Oasis, Iron Maiden, and Def Leppard, to the pop girl group the Spice Girls.

British Airways painted a cropped Union Flag on their tail fins until 1984, from 1997 on, they started painting a stylised, fluttering Union flag on tail fins, nicknamed Chatham Dockyard Union Flag. The coat of arms of British Airways also features the escutcheon cropped from the Union Flag. British Airways used the coat of arms on their aircraft via the Landor livery between 1984–1997 and added back in 2011, also used as cap badge for pilots or in advertisements.

The BMW Mini tail lights are shaped after the Union Jack.

Gallery

Union Flag variants 1606–1801

Union Flag in folk art

See also

 Cross
 List of British flags
 Northern Ireland flags issue
 Star of India (flag)
 Union Jack Club
 Union mark of Norway and Sweden

Notes

References

Further reading

External links

 
 Union Jack at the Royal Family website
 Union Flag: approved designs at the College of Arms website
 Union Flag protocol at the College of Arms website 
 British flags during The Protectorate and the Commonwealth of England – see external link
 BBC page for 400th anniversary of flag
 Monochrome Union Flag not flown to avoid controversy
 How to draw the Union Jack
 Union Jack Flag Infographic
 History of the Union Jack video
 UK Flag Protocol
 Poll asks if Welsh element to Union flag idea is a flyer. BBC News. Published 26 September 2014.

British Empire
 
Flags of Northern Ireland
National symbols of the United Kingdom
Unionism in the United Kingdom
Jacks (flags)
1801 establishments in the United Kingdom
Flags introduced in 1801